Colloquies (Latin title Colloquia familiaria) is one of the many works of the "Prince of Christian Humanists", Desiderius Erasmus. Published in 1518, the pages "...held up contemporary religious practices for examination in a more serious but still pervasively ironic tone". Christian Humanists viewed Erasmus as their leader in the early 16th century. Erasmus' works had greater meaning to those learned few who had a larger knowledge of Latin and Greek.
Colloquies in Latin means a formal written dialogue, thus in his book Erasmus explores man's reaction to others in conversations.

The Colloquies is a collection of dialogues on a wide variety of subjects. They began in the late 1490s as informal Latin exercises for Erasmus' own pupils. In about 1522 he began to perceive the possibilities this form might hold for continuing his campaign for the gradual enlightenment and reform of all Christendom. Between that date and 1533 twelve new editions appeared, each larger and more serious than the last, until eventually some fifty individual colloquies were included ranging over such varied subjects as war, travel, religion, sleep, beggars, funerals, and literature. All of these works were in the same graceful, easy style and gentle humor that made them continually sought as schoolboy exercises and light reading for generations.

Editions and translations

Desiderius Erasmus, Colloquies, trans. by Craig R. Thompson, Collected Works of Erasmus, 39–40, 2 vols (Toronto: University of Toronto Press, 1997), II, 631ff.
Desiderius Erasmus, The Colloquies of Erasmus, trans. by Nathan Bailey, ed. by E. Johnson, 2 vols (London: Reeves and Turner, 1878) (scanned books original editions)

References 

Books by Desiderius Erasmus
1518 books
16th-century Latin books